Kevum or Kavum is a deep-fried Sri Lankan sweet made from rice flour and  kithul (sugar-palm) treacle, with a number of variants adding additional ingredients. It is also known as oil cake.  Kevum is traditionally given and consumed during celebrations of Sinhala and Tamil New Year.

History
Kevum is mentioned in ancient Sri Lankan texts including the Ummagga Jatakaya, Saddharma Ratnawaliya and Pujawaliya.

Varieties
The Dhathuwansaya, an ancient Sinhala text, mentions 18 kinds of kevum including Sedhi Kevum, Mun Kevum, Ulundu Kevum, Uthupu (shaped using a coconut shell) and Ginipu (fire kevum).

 Konda kevum - hair kevum is the most common variant. It has a dark reddish color. The dough of rice flour and kithul treacle is flavored with salt and cardamom. Konda is the Sinhala word for hair,  and is named so as the shape of the konda kevum resembles hair tied up into a bun. It is shaped by hand and without a special mold.   
 Naran kevum - mandarin kevum is the size and shape of a mandarin, colored yellow with saffron. Green gram flour and scraped coconut are added to the basic kevum mix of rice flour and treacle.
 Thala kevum - sesame kevum has sesame in the kevum dough.
 Undu kevum - dal kevum is kevum flavored with urad dal.
 Mun kevum - gram kevum adds green gram flour and saffron to the kevum mix of rice flour and treacle. The kevum are diamond shaped and yellow.
 Handi kevum -  spoon kevun is flavored with cumin and fennel.

References

External links

Aluth Avurudu Recipe: Kavum (Oil Cake) on inside.lk

Sri Lankan desserts and sweets
Sinhalese New Year foods